Lydia Susanna "Linda" Hunt (born April 2, 1945) is an American actress of stage and screen.

She made her film debut playing Mrs. Oxheart in Popeye (1980). Hunt portrayed the male character Billy Kwan in The Year of Living Dangerously (1982) for which she won the Academy Award for Best Supporting Actress, becoming the first person to win an Oscar for portraying a character of the opposite sex. Hunt has also appeared in films such as Dune (1984), Silverado (1985), Kindergarten Cop (1990), Pocahontas (1995), Pocahontas II: Journey to a New World (1998), and Stranger Than Fiction (2006).

Hunt has had a successful career on television and in voice-over work, notably being the narrator for the Ancient Greek mythology themed God of War video game series. From 1997 to 2002, she played the recurring role of Judge Zoey Hiller on The Practice and played Commander Chennault on the sci-fi series Space Rangers. Beginning in 2009, she has portrayed Henrietta "Hetty" Lange on the CBS television series NCIS: Los Angeles, a role for which she has received two Teen Choice Awards.

Early life
Hunt was born on April 2, 1945, in Morristown, New Jersey. Her father, Raymond Davy Hunt (1902–1985), was vice president of Harper Fuel Oil. Her mother, Elsie Doying Hunt (1903 – c. 1994), was a piano teacher who taught at the Westport School of Music, and performed with the Saugatuck Congregational Church Choir in Westport, Connecticut, the town where Hunt would be raised. She has one sibling, an older sister named Marcia (born 1940). Hunt attended the Interlochen Arts Academy and graduated from the Goodman School of Drama at the Art Institute of Chicago (now at DePaul University).

Career

Theatre
Hunt was a well-known live-stage actress before she entered film and television. She made her Broadway debut in the 1975 revival of Ah, Wilderness. She was nominated for the Tony Award for Best Actress in a Play for her work in the 1984 play End of the World. She also received two ensemble Obie Awards for her work Off-Broadway in Top Girls and A Metamorphosis in Miniature.

Hunt created the role of Aunt Dan in Wallace Shawn's play Aunt Dan and Lemon.  She was a member of the Long Wharf Theatre Company in Connecticut, where she performed  the Player Queen in a production of Hamlet, amongst other roles.  She portrayed Sister Aloysius in the Pasadena Playhouse production of John Patrick Shanley's play Doubt.  Hunt was praised for her performance as the title character in Bertolt Brecht's Mother Courage and Her Children. She also appeared as Pope Joan in Caryl Churchill's Top Girls when London's Royal Court Theatre's production was staged at the Public Theater in New York.

In an interview with writer Craig Gholson and actor Vincent Caristi, Hunt said: "Acting onstage is like an explosion each night.

Film
Known for her small stature, Hunt made her film debut in 1980 in Robert Altman's musical comedy Popeye.

Two years later, Hunt co-starred as Billy Kwan in The Year of Living Dangerously, Peter Weir's film adaptation of the novel of the same name. For her work in this film, Hunt won the Academy Award for Best Supporting Actress in 1983, becoming the first person to win an Oscar for playing a character of the opposite sex. In her screen test, Hunt wore a hairpiece, a fake moustache, and "paste-on pieces above her eyes to [appear] Asian." To play the role, Hunt had her hair dyed and cut short, had her eyebrows shaved, wore padding and makeup, and wore something in her shirt pocket. In her 1986 interview with the Bomb magazine, Hunt remarked that Billy Kwan "is supra-personal [with] layers of sexual ambiguity[.]"

Hunt also played the Shadout Mapes in Dune (1984 film), a nurse in She-Devil (1989), the austere school principal Miss Schlowski opposite Arnold Schwarzenegger in Kindergarten Cop (1990), and assassin Ilsa Grunt in If Looks Could Kill (1991).

Television
Hunt's television appearances include recurring roles as Judge Zoey Hiller on David E. Kelley's series The Practice and as Dr. Claire Bryson on Without a Trace. She has narrated several installments of The American Experience on PBS. Since 2009, she has co-starred as Operations Manager Henrietta "Hetty" Lange on the CBS show NCIS: Los Angeles. Her co-stars on that show have included Chris O'Donnell, LL Cool J, Daniela Ruah, Eric Christian Olsen, Miguel Ferrer and Barrett Foa. Hunt has won two Teen Choice Awards for her work on NCIS: Los Angeles.

Voice work
Hunt is known for her husky voice. She has narrated numerous documentaries, cartoons, and commercials. She is the on-air host for City Arts & Lectures, a radio program recorded by KQED public radio at the Nourse Theater in San Francisco. Hunt voiced the role of Grandmother Willow in the animated musical film Pocahontas (1995) and its direct-to-video sequel Pocahontas II: Journey to a New World (1998).

Hunt narrated the National Geographic documentary The Great Indian Railway (1995). In 1998, she narrated the Discovery Channel documentary "Titanic: Untold Stories." Hunt's voice work also includes the character of Management in Carnivàle (2003, 2005) and the narrator for God of War video game series. She narrated a PBS Nature special entitled Christmas in Yellowstone (2006).

Personal life
Hunt has been in a relationship with psychotherapist Karen Kline since 1978. The two were married in 2008.

As a teenager, Hunt was diagnosed as having hypopituitary dwarfism.

Hunt is an ambassador for the Best Friends Animal Society.

In July 2018, People magazine reported that she was involved in a multicar accident in Los Angeles. The accident resulted in Hunt taking most of a year off from NCIS: Los Angeles.

Filmography

Video games
 God of War as Gaia/Narrator
 God of War II as Gaia/Narrator
 God of War: Chains of Olympus as Gaia/Narrator
 God of War III as Gaia/Narrator
 God of War: Ghost of Sparta as Gaia/Narrator
 God of War: Ascension as Gaia/Narrator

Television credits

Theatre

See also
 List of LGBT Academy Award winners and nominees

References

External links
 
 
 
 Linda Hunt at City Arts & Lectures

1945 births
Living people
American film actresses
American stage actresses
American television actresses
American video game actresses
American voice actresses
Best Supporting Actress Academy Award winners
Best Supporting Actress AACTA Award winners
DePaul University alumni
LGBT actresses
American LGBT actors
LGBT people from New Jersey
Obie Award recipients
People from Westport, Connecticut
Interlochen Center for the Arts alumni
20th-century American actresses
21st-century American actresses
Actresses from Connecticut
Actors with dwarfism